The Interstate Renewable Energy Council (IREC), established in 1982, is a non-profit organization working with clean energy. It is based in Latham, New York.

IREC works to expand consumer access to clean energy, generates information and objective analysis in best practices and standards, and leads programs in building clean energy workforces. It is an accredited American National Standards developer. The organization is overseen by a board of directors, and employs a range of technical and policy experts.

References

External links 
Interstate Renewable Energy Council website 
American National Standards Institute (ANSI)
National SolSmart Program
IREC Clean Energy Training
Sustainable Energy Action Committee (SEAC)
IREC National Shared Renewables Scorecard
Green Buildings Career Map
Solar Career Map
HVAC Career Map

Renewable energy organizations based in the United States